The following persons were appointed as Quartermaster General of the New Jersey National Guard. The position has no term-limit:

Stephen Hart Barlow (1895–?) 1934 to 1942.
C. Edward Murray ? to 1934
Richard Grant Augustus Donnelly (1834–1905) circa 1898.
James Jefferson Wilson (1775–1824) 1821 to 1824.
Garret Dorset Wall (1783–1850) 1815 to 1837(?).

References